Sa Dingding (born Zhou Peng on 27 December 1979) is a Chinese folk singer and songwriter. She is of mixed Han Chinese and Mongol ancestry, and sings in languages including Mandarin Chinese, English, Standard Tibetan, as well as an imaginary self-created language to evoke emotions in her songs. She also plays traditional instruments such as the guzheng and morin khuur.

Early life and education
Sa was born in Pingdingshan, Henan. She became interested in Buddhism and taught herself Tibetan and Sanskrit. Later, at 17, she moved to Beijing, to study music at the People's Liberation Army Academy of Art.

Career
At age 18, she released her first album entitled Dong Ba La under her birth name Zhou Peng, gaining her the title of China's Best Dance Music Singer

In 2006, "Holy Incense" was used as the theme song for the movie Prince of the Himalayas, directed by Sherwood Hu. In mid-2007, she released Alive, available physically and as a download in many countries. The Hong Kong release of the album featured a DVD containing music videos, a remix of "Alive", making of footage and a Chinese version of "Mama Tian Na", not featured on the album.

In 2008, she won the BBC Radio 3 Awards for World Music for the Asia-Pacific region, earning herself the chance to perform at the Royal Albert Hall to a Western audience. In the same year, she also released a two track single called "Qin Shang".

Dingding composed a song with Éric Mouquet of Deep Forest called "Won't Be Long" to raise funds for disaster relief after the 2008 Sichuan earthquake. The song was made available on Mouquet's Deep-Projects website. Mouquet and Dingding have collaborated on an album Deep China.

Dingding has appeared at World of Music, Arts and Dance and the Harrogate International Festivals in the UK. On 6 October 2008, her official English website was updated with information about a European tour, going from 7 to 17 November, making stops in Germany, London, Paris, Amsterdam, Las Palmas, Australia and New Zealand. For Chinese composer He Xuntian's 2008 album, Tathāgata, Dingding contributed the vocals for the second track, entitled "Dátǎjiādá".

Her January 2010 album was Harmony, with nine songs in Chinese. The album also contains three remixes of the title track, one by Paul Oakenfold. In 2018, Dingding starred in the hit fantasy romance drama Ashes of Love, portraying the Immortal Yuanji.

Discography
Albums
Dong Ba La (2001)
Alive – Universal Music, Wrasse Records (2007)
Harmony (2010)
The Coming Ones (2012)
Wonderland (Remix Album) (2014)
The Butterfly Dream (2015)

Singles
"Qin Shang" – Wrasse Records (2008)
"Tiandi Ji"/"Ha Ha Li Li" – Universal Music Group (2009)

Soundtracks
Theme song of 14 Blades
"Upwards to the Moon" (左手指月) (2018) – Ashes of Love 
"Unsullied" (不染) (2018) – Ashes of Love
"When Meeting You" (当遇见你) (2020) - Skate into Love
"If You Come Back" (如若归来) (2021) - The Long Ballad
"As You Wish" (2022) - The Blue Whisper

Filmography

Television series

References

External links
 Official UK website
 Official Weibo (Chinese)
 Official blog (Chinese)
 Official Japanese website (Japanese)
 Fans Page on Facebook (English)

Interviews
"Freedom is the first thing I learnt from Music" Laptoprockers, December 2008
Sa Dingding interview from Global Rhythm magazine, August 2008

News articles
 "Sa Dingding: China's New Age chanteuse" CNN
 "Made in China: the singer poised to sweep the globe" The Independent
 Sa Ding Ding, the Asian Bjork. The Times
 The Guardian, Friday March 28, 2008
 Biography from Universal Music
 Biography at Livedoor.com (Japanese)
 "Why Sa Dingding has China in her hand" The Daily Telegraph, 18 July 2008

Living people
Chinese folk singers
Chinese women singer-songwriters
Mandarin-language singers
Sanskrit-language singers
Tibetan-language singers
People's Liberation Army Arts College alumni
Performers of Buddhist music
Singers from Henan
Wrasse Records artists
Chinese people of Mongolian descent
21st-century Chinese women singers
Year of birth missing (living people)